Akelaitis is a Lithuanian surname. Notable people with the surname include:

Adolfas Akelaitis (1910–2007), Lithuanian high jumper
Mikalojus Akelaitis (1829–1887), Lithuanian writer, publicist, and amateur linguist

Lithuanian-language surnames
Surnames of Lithuanian origin